Dalkarlsån is a river in Sweden located in Västerbotten. The river is around 50 kilometers of length and with a river basin spanning around 346.5 kilometers.

References

Rivers of Västerbotten County